NGC 6572 is a planetary nebula with magnitude 8.1, easily bright enough to make it an appealing target for amateur astronomers with telescopes. NGC 6572 is a young planetary nebula. NGC 6572 began to shed its gases a few thousand years ago. Because of this, the material is still quite concentrated, which explains its abnormal brightness. The envelope of gas is currently racing out into space at a speed of around 15 kilometres per second. As it becomes more diffuse, it will dim. It is located within the large constellation of Ophiuchus (the Serpent Bearer) and at low magnification, it will appear to be just a colored star, but higher magnification will reveal its shape. NGC 6572 was discovered in 1825 by the German astronomer Friedrich Georg Wilhelm von Struve. According to several sources such as Sky & Telescope, this object received the nicknames Blue Racquetball, Emerald Nebula, Green Nebula, Turquoise Orb.

The central star of the planetary nebula has a spectral type of Of-WR(H).

References

External links 
 
 A Dazzling Planetary Nebula — ESA/Hubble Picture of the week.

Planetary nebulae
6572
Ophiuchus (constellation)